Terrence Murphy may refer to:
Terrence Murphy (American football) (born 1982), retired American football player.
Terrence Murphy (chiropractor) (born 1966), New York State Senator
Terrence Murphy (Canadian politician) (1926–2008), Canadian lawyer, politician and judge

See also
 Terry Murphy (disambiguation)